The 1986 Federation Cup was the 24th edition of the most important competition between national teams in women's tennis.  The tournament was held at I. Czech Lawn Tennis Club in Prague, Czechoslovakia, from 20 to 27 July.  The United States defeated three-time defending champions Czechoslovakia in the final (in what was a rematch of last year's final), giving the USA their 12th title.  The finals marked Martina Navratilova's first return to Czechoslovakia since her defection to the United States in 1975.

Qualifying round
All ties were played at I. Czech Lawn Tennis Club in Prague, Czechoslovakia, on clay courts.

Winning nations advance to Main Draw, losing nations play in Consolation rounds.

Romania vs. Ireland

Belgium vs. Finland

Indonesia vs. Chile

Poland vs. Mexico

South Korea vs. Luxembourg

China vs. Israel

Malta vs. Chinese Taipei

Yugoslavia vs. Norway

Uruguay vs. Philippines

Main draw

1st Round losing teams play in Consolation rounds

First round

Czechoslovakia vs. Greece

Malta vs. Switzerland

Great Britain vs. Denmark

Hungary vs. Australia

Netherlands vs. Canada

Japan vs. Austria

Egypt vs. South Korea

Uruguay vs. Argentina

Bulgaria vs. Soviet Union

France vs. Sweden

Brazil vs. Romania

Belgium vs. West Germany

Italy vs. New Zealand

Yugoslavia vs. Poland

Spain vs. Indonesia

China vs. United States

Second round

Czechoslovakia vs. Switzerland

Denmark vs. Australia

Canada vs. Austria

South Korea vs. Argentina

Bulgaria vs. France

Brazil vs. West Germany

Italy vs. Yugoslavia

Spain vs. United States

Quarterfinals

Czechoslovakia vs. Australia

Austria vs. Argentina

Bulgaria vs. West Germany

Italy vs. United States

Semifinals

Czechoslovakia vs. Argentina

West Germany vs. United States

Final

Czechoslovakia vs. United States

Consolation rounds

Draw

First round

Chile vs. Romania

Norway vs. Ireland

Philippines vs. China

Luxembourg vs. Mexico

Poland vs. Hungary

Uruguay vs. Chinese Taipei

Belgium vs. Egypt

Malta vs. Indonesia

Israel vs. Finland

Second round

Soviet Union vs. Romania

Greece vs. Ireland

Japan vs. China

Netherlands vs. Luxembourg

Hungary vs. Uruguay

Belgium vs. Sweden

Indonesia vs. New Zealand

Finland vs. Great Britain

Quarterfinals

Soviet Union vs. Greece

Japan vs. Netherlands

Hungary vs. Belgium

Indonesia vs. Great Britain

Semifinals

Soviet Union vs. Netherlands

Hungary vs. Great Britain

Final

Soviet Union vs. Great Britain

References

Billie Jean King Cups by year
Federation
Tennis tournaments in the Czech Republic
Sports competitions in Prague
1986 in women's tennis
1986 in Czechoslovak women's sport